Nassy may refer to:

 David Cohen Nassy, a colonizer who started Jewish colonies in the Caribbean
 Josef Nassy, an artist of Jewish descent
 a Pokémon character, see List of Pokémon (102–151)#Exeggutor